Sean Dorrance Kelly is an American philosopher, currently the Teresa G. and Ferdinand F. Martignetti Professor of Philosophy at Harvard University, where he also serves as Faculty Dean of Dunster House.  He is an expert on phenomenology and philosophy of mind.

Education and career

A graduate of Brown University, he received his PhD from the University of California, Berkeley, in 1998, and was an Assistant Professor of Philosophy at Princeton University from 1999 until 2006, when he moved to Harvard. He is known for his expertise on various aspects of the philosophical, phenomenological, and cognitive neuroscientific nature of human experience. He is featured in Tao Ruspoli's film Being in the World.

Books
 The Relevance of Phenomenology to the Philosophy of Language and Mind (Studies in Philosophy), Sean D. Kelly, Routledge, 2000
 All Things Shining: Reading the Western Classics to Find Meaning in a Secular Age, Hubert Dreyfus and Sean Dorrance Kelly, Free Press, 2011

Articles 
 Chapter 6. Edmund Husserl and Phenomenology

See also
Critique of technology
Hubert Dreyfus

References

External links
 Sean Dorrance Kelly
 All Things Shining
 Sean Dorrance Kelly on lack of the sacred in our existence

21st-century American philosophers
Phenomenologists
Continental philosophers
Philosophers of art
Philosophers of language
Philosophers of science
Philosophers of mind
Philosophers of culture
Existentialists
Philosophy academics
Heidegger scholars
Living people
Harvard University faculty
Brown University alumni
University of California, Berkeley alumni
Academic staff of the École Normale Supérieure
Princeton University faculty
Stanford University faculty
Date of birth missing (living people)
Year of birth missing (living people)